Caleta de Sebo (or Caleta del Sebo) is the main settlement and capital community of La Graciosa (Canary Islands, Spain).

With a population of 730 (INE, 2018), Caleta de Sebo, together with the rest of the island of La Graciosa, is included in the municipality of Teguise on Lanzarote.

Tourism is the main industry along with fishing. Every year, tourists visit the island for its temperate climate and its sandy volcanic coasts. The island has a school, a lyceum, a post office, supermarkets, a port, beaches, the only bank in the island (a Bankia bank branch in danger of elimination as of September 2013) and a square (plaza) where bicycles can be hired.

The town is the only port of entry to the island, offering regular ferry services to Órzola, Lanzarote.

Demographics

References

Graciosa, Canary Islands